Lamphey is both a village, a parish and a community near the south coast of Pembrokeshire, Wales, approximately  east of the historic town of Pembroke, and  north of the seaside village of Freshwater East. The 2011 census reported a population of 843.

Freshwater East is in the community as is the village of Hodgeston.

The village includes the ruins of the fourteenth-century Lamphey Bishop's Palace; a palace of the Bishop of St David's.

Church of St Tyfai and St Faith
The parish church, dedicated to St Tyfai (or Tyfie) and St Faith, is medieval in origin but was largely rebuilt in 1869–1871 by the architect Ewan Christian. The fine tower is thirteenth or fourteenth century. In the chancel a piscina and two lancet windows date from the thirteenth century, but have been repositioned. The font is Norman.

Notable landmarks

Several Georgian-era buildings remain, including the guesthouse, Lower Lamphey Park on the Ridgeway. The village has two hotels/restaurants, The Dial public house, a primary school, a service station with a shop, a hairdressers, and a local bakery which has served the community for generations. There are playing fields. The village hall, with a capacity of 120 people, was completed in 2007.

Bishop Vaughan was responsible for adding the first-floor chapel on the north side of Lamphey Hall in the early 16th century. In 1542, Lamphey Manor was "surrendered to Henry VIII in exchange for the rich rectory of Carew".

The grade II listed Lamphey Court, a Georgian mansion, was built in 1823 to the west of the ruins of the Bishop's Palace. It was the seat of the Mathias family until it was sold in 1978 by Wing Commander Lewis Mathias, the High Sheriff of Pembrokeshire.

Governance
Lamphey, together with Cosheston, forms an electoral ward. The total ward population taken at the 2011 Census was 1,671.

Railway 
Lamphey railway station on the Pembroke Dock branch of the West Wales Line is operated by Transport for Wales Rail, who also manage the station.

River 
The Pembroke River rises at nearby Hodgeston Hill to flow through Lamphey to Pembroke Castle.

See also

 Lamphey Bishop's Palace
 Lamphey Cricket Club Ground

References

External links
 Photos of Lamphey and surrounding area on geograph.org.uk

Villages in Pembrokeshire
Communities in Pembrokeshire